Scarborough State Beach is a public recreation area fronting the Atlantic Ocean in the town of Narragansett, Rhode Island. The state park occupies  comprising two units located at 870 and 970 Ocean Road. The beach offers saltwater bathing, picnicking, observation tower, and boardwalk and is open seasonally.

History
The beach was first developed with a pavilion in 1937. The two-unit complex was created with the addition of a southern component when the state purchased 7-acre Lido's Beach in 1981 and 9-acre Olivo's Beach in 1986. Extensive renovations were completed in 1987.

References

External links
Scarborough North State Beach Rhode Island Department of Environmental Management Division of Parks & Recreation

State parks of Rhode Island
Narragansett, Rhode Island
Beaches of Rhode Island
Beaches of Washington County, Rhode Island
Protected areas of Washington County, Rhode Island
Protected areas established in 1937
1937 establishments in Rhode Island